Lungnyi Gewog (Dzongkha: ལུང་གཉིས་) is a gewog (village block) of Paro District, Bhutan. In 2002, the gewog had an area of 59.7 square kilometres and contained seven villages and 265 households.

References 

Gewogs of Bhutan
Paro District